Olavi Sihvonen (24 September 1918 – 21 October 1984) was a Finnish nordic combined skier who competed in the 1940s. He finished fifth in the Nordic combined event at the 1948 Winter Olympics in St. Moritz.

Cross-country skiing results

Olympic Games

World Championships

References

External links

1918 births
1984 deaths
Finnish male cross-country skiers
Finnish male Nordic combined skiers
Cross-country skiers at the 1948 Winter Olympics
Nordic combined skiers at the 1948 Winter Olympics
Olympic cross-country skiers of Finland
Olympic Nordic combined skiers of Finland
20th-century Finnish people